Bobby  is a 2002 Indian Telugu-language romance film written and directed by Sobhan and produced by K. Krishna Mohan Rao. The movie stars Mahesh Babu, Aarthi Agarwal, Raghuvaran, and Prakash Raj while Brahmanandam, Sunil, Pragathi, Ravi Babu, and Meher Ramesh play supporting roles. The soundtrack of the movie was scored by Mani Sharma, the cinematography was done by Venkat R. Prasad, and editing was handled by S. Sudhakar Reddy. The film released on 31 October 2002.

Plot 
Yadagiri is a disabled mafia leader in Hyderabad, and KR is a rich businessman. Bhagyamati is Yadagiri's daughter, and Bobby is KR's son. The story of this film deals with what happens when these two people fall in love with each other. Bobby meets Bhagyamati in a club and falls in love with her. They later find out that their fathers are arch rivals. Bhagyamati's mother was killed in an accident involving their fathers. Knowing this, Bobby and Bhagyamati elope, but due to unavoidable circumstances, they come back and are injured in a bomb blast. Then, their fathers apologize and make up. In the end Bobby and Bhagyamati are married.

Cast 

 Mahesh Babu as Bobby
 Aarthi Agarwal as Bhagyamati
 Raghuvaran as KR, Bobby's father
 Prakash Raj as Yadagiri, Bhagyamati's father
 Brahmanandam as AmmiRaju
 Sunil as Hotel Manager
 Pragathi as Bobby's mother
 Meher Ramesh as Sunil
 Rama Prabha as Bhagyamati's grandmother
 Ravi Babu as Ravi Shankar
 Posani Krishna Murali as Koti
 Chittajalu Lakshmipati as Home Minister
 L.B. Sriram
 Sai Vignesh as Road side Kid      
  Ramakrishna Veerapaneni

Reception 
Idlebrain.com gave the film 3.25 out of 5 and praised Mahesh Babu for his acting. Sify gave 3 out of five stars and added that "The film lacks a basic story, as there is nothing new."

Music 

The film has 6 songs composed by Mani Sharma.

 "Ee Jenda" – Shankar Mahadevan, Lyrics by Shakthi 
 "Vaa Vaa" – S.P. Balu & Sunitha Upadrashta, Lyrics by Suddala Ashok Teja
 "Lokam" – Kalpana, Lyrics by Shakti
 "Pullani Pullattu" – Mano, Lyrics by Bharati Babu
 "Adugadugu" – Hariharan, Ranjith, Lyrics by Shakthi
 "Laalu Darwaja" – Mallikarjun, Kalpana, Lyrics by Shakthi

References

External links
 

2000s Telugu-language films
2002 films
Films scored by Mani Sharma
Telugu remakes of Hindi films
Films directed by Sobhan